The women's coxless pair competition at the 1996 Summer Olympics in Atlanta, Georgia took place at Lake Lanier.

Results

Heats
The first 3 places of each heat advanced to semifinals, the remaining go to the repechage.

Heat 1

Heat 2

Heat 3

Repechage
The first three places of the repechage advanced to the semifinals, and the remaining team was eliminated.

Repechage

Semifinals
The first three places of the semifinal advanced to the Final A, and the remaining to Final B.

Semifinal 1

Semifinal 2

Finals

Final B

Final A

References

Rowing at the 1996 Summer Olympics
Women's rowing at the 1996 Summer Olympics